Jorge Alfredo Valadéz Callente (born 24 February 1996) is a Mexican footballer who last played as a defender for Correcaminos UAT.

Career

Youth
Valadez joined Morelia's youth academy in 2011. He continued through Monarcas Youth Academy successfully going through the U-15, U-17 and U-20. Until Zárate finally reached the first team, Roberto Herenández being the coach promoting him to first team.

Morelia
Valadez made his Liga MX debut on 29 September 2017 in a 3–0 win against Club Tijuana.

References

External links

Debut with Morelia

1996 births
Living people
Mexican footballers
Liga MX players
Atlético Morelia players
Footballers from Guanajuato
Association football defenders